The FBA Avion Canon (aka FBA 1 Ca2) was a two-seat cannon-armed biplane fighter, designed and built in France from 1916. due to unsatisfactory performance, development of the Avion Canon was abandoned.

Design and development
During 1916, Louis Schreck, chief designer of Franco-British Aviation Company (FBA), developed a two-seat cannon armed fighter, by mounting the biplane wings from the FBA H flying boat on an aerodynamically clean wooden monocoque fuselage, with conventional tailskid undercarriage. Power was supplied by a  Hispano-Suiza 8A V-8 water-cooled engine mounted as a pusher between the upper and lower mainplanes. After initial testing  the engine was replaced with a  Hispano-Suiza 8Aa. Performance was unsatisfactory and further development was cancelled.

Specifications (FBA Avion Canon)

References

Further reading

External links
 

1910s French fighter aircraft
FBA aircraft
Aircraft first flown in 1916